HODE may refer to:

 9-Hydroxyoctadecadienoic acid (9-HODE)
 13-Hydroxyoctadecadienoic acid (13-HODE)

See also
 Hode, Kentucky